Vetster is a Canadian veterinary telemedicine company. It is headquartered in Toronto, Canada.

History
Vetster was formed in 2020 by Mark Bordo and Regan Johnson. The company hired Sarah Machell as its lead veterinarian and medical director. Bordo assumed the role of CEO and Johnson was appointed CTO.

Vetster announced its online pet pharmacy service, VetsterRX to the US market on August 24, 2021. As of October 2021, Vetster had 35 employees.

Together with OnePoll, Vetster published a survey on pet guilt.

Jodi Kovitz also became the company's Chief Growth Officer in July 2021. Cerys Goodall was named Chief Operating Officer in January 2022, when Rahul Nirula joined as its Chief Product Officer.

The Vetster platform allows users to schedule online consultations with veterinarians and veterinary technicians. Users can schedule consultations at any time of the day and any day of the week. The platform lets users choose which professionals to consult with, rather than assigning them to a veterinarian or technician. Users can receive a prescription through VetsterRx or their local human pharmacy where legally available.

Vetster offers video, text, and voice chat appointments. The Vetster platform can be accessed through the Vetster website or the Vetster mobile app.

In April 2022, the company signed a partnership with PetMed Express. As part of the agreement, PetMeds will be the exclusive eCommerce provider of Vetster medications, and Vetster will be the exclusive provider of telehealth services to PetMed's customers. 

In August 2022, the company launched in the UK following a £25m raise.

References

Companies established in 2020